is a mountain located in Shikotsu-Toya National Park in Hokkaidō, Japan. It sits on the south shore of Lake Shikotsu, a caldera lake.

References

 Geographical Survey Institute
 Paul Hunt, Hiking in Japan: An Adventurer's Guide to the Mountain Trails, Tokyo, Kodansha International Ltd., 1988.  and  C0075

Tappukoppu